Denver Energy Center is an office complex in Denver, Colorado. It consists of Denver Energy Center I and II. Both buildings were owned by Rosemont Realty Inc. until the property fell into foreclosure and was sold at auction in June 2022.  It was formerly known as Denver World Trade Center, which moved to another location in Denver.

Facilities
It has 28 floors and is the 42nd tallest building in Denver.

It has 29 floors and is the 30th tallest building in Denver.

The office complex includes two Class A LEED Gold certified towers and have a combined total area of 785,549 square ft.

History
In June 2022, an affiliate of JP Morgan Chase was the sole bidder on the foreclosed Denver Energy Center buildings. The buyer was also the lender on the 785,549 square foot property, paying $88.2M for the building in the foreclosure auction. The property had been previously owned by Los Angeles-based Gemini Rosemont who purchased the property for approximately $176M in April 2013.

Gallery

See also
List of tallest buildings in Denver

References
World Trade Center Denver website
World Trade Center I
World Trade Center II
Two-tower downtown Denver office complex going through foreclosure

References

Skyscraper office buildings in Denver
Office buildings completed in 1979
Twin towers
World Trade Centers
Brookfield Properties buildings
Skidmore, Owings & Merrill buildings